Cule is a mountain in Peru.

Cule may also refer to:

Cule (surname)
Ćule, a mountain in Kosovo.
Čule, a village in Bosnia and Herzegovina